Superliga de Voleibol Masculina 2015–16 was the 52nd (LII) season since its establishment in 1965. The 2015–16 regular season started on October 3, 2015, and finished on April 2, 2016.

Championship playoffs began on 9 April. Starting with semifinals, the two semifinal winners will advance to the Final to fight for the championship title to the best of three matches.

Defending champions were Unicaja Almería, by winning 2014–15 championship final 3–1 to CAI Teruel. 

The championship was decided in a thrilling five-games series, winning Unicaja Almería the fifth and final match, and becoming champions for the eleventh time in its history.

Competition format 
12 teams played in a round-robin format. Upon completion of regular season, the top four teams play Championship's playoffs, while two bottom teams are relegated to Superliga 2.

During regular season, points are awarded as following:
a win by 3–0 or 3–1 means 3 points to winner team, 
a 3–2 win, 2 points for winner team & 1 for loser team.

Championship playoffs is played to best of 3 games.

2015–16 season teams

Regular season standings

Championship playoff

All times are CEST, except for Canary Islands which is WEST.

Bracket
To best of five games.

Semifinals

Match 1

|}

Match 2

|}

Match 3

|}

Final

Match 1

|}

Match 2

|}

Match 3

|}

Match 4

|}

Match 5

|}
Final MVP:  Borja Ruiz

Top scorers
(Regular season and playoff statistic combined.)

References

External links
Official website

2015 in volleyball
2016 in volleyball
Superliga de Voleibol Masculina 
2015 in Spanish sport  
2016 in Spanish sport
Spain